Cypress Avenue West Historic District is a national historic district in Ridgewood, Queens, New York.  It includes 440 contributing buildings built between 1888 and 1906.  They consist mainly of brick two and three story row houses with one apartment per floor and three story tenements with two apartments per floor.  Also included in the district is Public School #81, St. John's Ridgewood United Methodist Church, and a row of commercial buildings. They feature Romanesque Revival style applied detailing.

It was listed on the National Register of Historic Places in 1983.

References

Ridgewood, Queens
Historic districts on the National Register of Historic Places in Queens, New York
Historic districts in Queens, New York